The Froschfelsen ("Frog Rocks", 545 m above NN), also called the Froschsteinklippe, is a natural monument near Ilsenburg in the northern Harz in central Germany. It is a formation of granite rocks that take the shape of a frog, hence the name.

The Froschfelsen is located on the Meineberg hill on the western side of the Ilse valley. It is a hiking destination and No. 5 in the system of checkpoints in the Harzer Wandernadel hiking network. The checkpoint is in a nearby refuge hut.

References 

Natural monuments in Saxony-Anhalt
Rock formations of the Harz
Ilsenburg
Rock formations of Saxony-Anhalt
Protected areas of Saxony-Anhalt